Cheshmeh Chenar-e Yasuj (also Romanized as Cheshmeh Chenār-e Yāsūj; also known as Cheshmeh Chenār) is a village in Kakan Rural District, in the Central District of Boyer-Ahmad County, Kohgiluyeh and Boyer-Ahmad Province, Iran. At the 2006 census, its population was 100, in 22 families.

References 

Populated places in Boyer-Ahmad County